Fleming may refer to:

Places

Australia
Fleming, Northern Territory, a town and a locality

Canada
 Fleming, Saskatchewan
 Fleming Island (Saskatchewan)

Egypt
 Fleming (neighborhood), a neighborhood in Alexandria

Greenland
 Fleming Fjord

Italy
 Fleming (Rome), a neighborhood

United States
 Fleming, Colorado
Fleming, Georgia
 Fleming, Indiana
 Fleming, Kansas
 Fleming, Kentucky, a predecessor of Fleming-Neon, Kentucky, in Letcher County
 Fleming County, Kentucky
 Fleming, Missouri
 Fleming, New York
 Fleming, Ohio

People
 Fleming (surname)
 Flemings, demonym for the Flemish people of Flanders, Belgium
 Clan Fleming, a Scottish clan

Other uses
 Fleming (crater), a lunar crater
 Fleming Building, a building in Des Moines, Iowa, United States
 Fleming College, a college in Peterborough, Ontario, Canada
 Fleming Companies, Inc, an American food supply company
 , more than one United States Navy ship
 Fleming: The Man Who Would Be Bond, 2014 TV mini-series
 Sir Sandford Fleming College, a College of Applied Arts and Technology in Peterborough, Ontario, Canada

See also
 Fläming, Germany
 Flamengo (disambiguation)
 Flemming, a surname
 Flemyng, a surname
 Fleming of Louhisaari, a clan of Finnish ancestry
 Fleming coat of arms, a Polish coat of arms